Sterling Burton Marlin (born June 30, 1957) is an American semi-retired, professional stock car racing driver. He currently competes part-time JEGS/CRA All-Stars Tour, driving the No. 114 for Sterling Marlin Racing. He formerly competed in the NASCAR Cup Series, winning the Daytona 500 in 1994 and 1995. He is the son of late NASCAR driver Coo Coo Marlin. He is married to Paula and has a daughter, Sutherlin, a son, Steadman, a former NASCAR Xfinity Series driver, and a grandson Stirlin who splits a schedule with Sterling in Sterling’s No. 114 Super Late Model.

Career

Beginnings
Marlin attended Spring Hill High School, where he played high school basketball and football, earning the captain status his senior year while he played quarterback and linebacker. He began his collection of civil war artifacts shortly after high school. In 1976, he made his NASCAR debut at Nashville Speedway, filling in for his injured father in the No. 14 H.B. Cunningham Chevrolet. He started 30th and finished 29th after suffering oil pump failure early in the race. He made two more starts in 1978, finishing ninth at World 600 and twenty-fifth at Nashville for Cunningham. He ran Nashville again in 1979, finishing seventeenth. In 1980, he posted two top-tens, eighth in the Daytona 500 for Cunningham, and seventh at Nashville for D.K. Ulrich. From 1980 to 1982, Marlin was a three-time track champion at the historic Nashville Speedway USA.

NASCAR career

1983–1990

In 1983, Marlin was hired by Roger Hamby to drive his No. 17 Hesco Exhaust-sponsored Chevrolet. He posted a tenth-place finish at Dover International Speedway and finished 19th in the standings, clinching the Rookie of the Year award. Despite finishing 15th in the 1984 Daytona 500 for Hamby, Marlin spent most of the season running for Sadler Brothers Racing, posting two top-ten finishes. He also competed in one race for Jimmy Means and Dick Bahre respectively. Marlin only made eight starts in 1985, seven of them coming for Sadler, his best finish being 12th at Talladega Superspeedway. He ended his season at Charlotte Motor Speedway in the Miller High Life 500, driving the Helen Rae Special. He finished 29th, after suffering flywheel failure.

Marlin moved over to the No. 1 Bull's Eye Barbecue Sauce-sponsored car owned by Hoss Ellington in 1986. His best finish that season came at the Firecracker 400, where he finished second. Marlin received a full-time ride in 1987, when he was hired by Billy Hagan to drive the No. 44 Piedmont Airlines-sponsored Oldsmobile. He had four top-fives and finished 11th in points. The following season, he had seven finishes of eighth or better in the first ten races and finished tenth in the standings. In 1989, the team received sponsorship from Sunoco and switched to the number 94. He tied a career-best 13 top-ten finishes but dropped to 12th in the final standings. He left the team at the end of the 1990 season. During the 1990 season, he won his first career Busch Series race at Charlotte, driving the No. 48 Diamond Ridge-sponsored Chevrolet owned by Fred Turner.

1991–1997

Marlin signed to drive the No. 22 Maxwell House-sponsored Ford Thunderbird for Junior Johnson in 1991. He had a second-place finish at Daytona to start the season and won two poles at Talladega Superspeedway and the Firecracker 400, and had a total of 7 top fives and 16 top tens, finishing 7th in the standings. The next season, he had 6 top fives, 13 top tens and 5 poles, finishing 10th in the standings. Marlin departed to drive the No. 8 Raybestos-sponsored Ford for Stavola Brothers Racing. In 1993, he had just 1 top five and 8 top tens and fell to 15th in the standings.

Marlin's first career win came in his 279th career start at the 1994 Daytona 500 driving for Morgan-McClure Motorsports in the No. 4 Kodak-sponsored Chevrolet, the most starts for a driver before his first win before Michael Waltrip's win at the 2001 Daytona 500. In 1994, he had 1 win, 5 top fives and 11 top tens, and rose slightly to 14th in the standings. He went on to win the 500 again in the following year, becoming only one of four drivers to win consecutive Daytona 500s. The other three men that have accomplished that feat were Richard Petty, Cale Yarborough and Denny Hamlin. He also became the only driver to have his first two career wins at the Daytona 500.  Marlin won 2 more times during the 1995 season (at Darlington and Talladega) for a total of 3 wins, 9 top fives, 22 top tens, 472 laps led, an average finish of 9.84, and ranking a career best 3rd in the standings. In 1996, Marlin had 2 wins, 5 top fives, 10 top tens, and finished 8th in the standings. In 1997, he scored just 2 top fives and 6 top tens, and dropped to 25th in the standings, leaving the No. 4 team at year's end.

1998–2006
In 1998, he joined SABCO Racing to drive the No. 40 Coors Light-sponsored Chevrolet. He opened the season by winning the Gatorade 125, a qualifying race for the Daytona 500 but three weeks later, he failed to qualify for the Primestar 500, the first race he had missed since 1986. He finished in the Top 10 six times and had a 13th-place points finish. In 1999, he won his first pole since 1995 at Pocono Raceway, but dropped down to sixteenth in the standings. In 2000, he won his second career Busch Series race, driving SABCO's No. 82 entry at Bristol Motor Speedway. During the season, he lost teammate Kenny Irwin Jr. in a practice crash at New Hampshire International Speedway. After finishing in the Top 10 seven times, he fell back to 19th in the overall standings.

In 2001, SABCO's majority ownership stake was purchased by CART & IndyCar championship owner Chip Ganassi and the team switched to Dodge Intrepids. In his first race with the new team, Marlin won the Gatorade 125 qualifying race at Daytona. Three days later at the Daytona 500, on the final lap, Dale Earnhardt's rear bumper made contact with Marlin in turn 4, causing Earnhardt to crash into the turn 4 wall, an impact that would kill him instantly. In the following days after the race, Marlin and his family received hate mail and death threats from angry fans of Earnhardt as well as the sport in general who felt that Marlin was responsible for Earnhardt's death. He was eventually publicly defended by two of Earnhardt's drivers, his son and race winner Michael Waltrip, and was also cleared of any wrongdoing by NASCAR's investigation into the accident. He won Dodge's first race in its return to NASCAR at Michigan International Speedway, as well as winning the UAW-GM Quality 500 at Charlotte. He tied his career best points finish of third that season. Had the current Chase points system been in place in 2001, Marlin would have been the 2001 champion.
In 2002, Marlin had a strong car at the Daytona 500, and towards the end was battling Jeff Gordon for the lead when they made contact, sending Gordon spinning. NASCAR had then red-flagged the race so it would not finish under caution, and stopped the field momentarily on the backstretch. Concerned about a damaged right front fender, Marlin jumped out of his car and started pulling the fender away from the tire. As working on the car is prohibited during red flag conditions under NASCAR regulations, Marlin was sent to the tail end of the field for the restart. Marlin would finish in 8th.

The following week, Marlin finished second in Rockingham to Matt Kenseth. Marlin took the points lead and did not let it go for the following 24 weeks. For most of that time he held a comfortable lead, which reached triple digits several times. Marlin followed this 2nd-place finish with a win at the UAW-DaimlerChrysler 400 at Las Vegas Motor Speedway, but not without controversy: During the race, Marlin spun while making late race pit stop, causing him to break the pit road speed limit. NASCAR's penalty for being too fast entering pit road was to hold the car in its pit stall for an additional 15 seconds, but the official at Marlin's pit stall was not informed of the penalty until after the crew had released the car. NASCAR determined that they had no precedent for forcing Marlin to return to the pits as his early release was their mistake (and they could not order him to return for a stop and go penalty). Following the incident, NASCAR changed the rule so that all speeding violations are enforced with a drive through penalty (forcing the driver to travel the length of pit road at the speed limit).

After this win, Marlin finished 9th the following week at Atlanta. The week after that, he won the Carolina Dodge Dealers 400 at Darlington Raceway, which would be the final win of his Cup career.

With a series of strong finishes (seventh at Texas, fifth at Talladega, seventh at California, fourth in June at Pocono, third at Daytona, third at the second Pocono race, sixth at Michigan in August, seventh at Bristol, and fourth at Darlington in the fall), Marlin was still 91 points ahead of second place entering the Chevy Monte Carlo 400 in September. However, Marlin finished that race in last place after an early accident and saw his points lead all but evaporate as Mark Martin, who had entered the race 125 points behind Marlin, gained 116 points and moved into second place in the points as Marlin's lead shrunk to nine points (Jeff Gordon, who had leapfrogged Martin for second place in the standings with a win the week before, also gained on Marlin but dropped to fourth due to the strong finishes from both Martin and Jimmie Johnson, who gained 95 points on Marlin to move into third). At the New Hampshire 300 the next week Marlin lost the points lead as Martin finished four places ahead of him, gaining 15 points. The next week, Marlin dropped to 4th in the standings after a 21st-place finish at Dover.

One week later, at the Protection One 400 at Kansas, Marlin had a hard crash after 147 laps and finished 33rd. He was diagnosed with a cracked vertebra in his neck and would be forced to miss the remaining seven races. Marlin was replaced by Busch Series driver Jamie McMurray, who had recently been signed by Chip Ganassi Racing to drive for the team in the 2003 season. McMurray won the UAW-GM Quality 500 in his second start with Marlin's car, and Marlin telephoned McMurray during the post-race festivities to congratulate him. Marlin ultimately finished 18th in the final season points with eight Top 5s and ten Top 10s. Marlin's injury was the beginning of a struggle for Chip Ganassi Racing to win races on a regular basis - a slump that would last from 2002 towards 2010.

Marlin did not finish in the Top 5 in 2003, but had 11 Top 10 finishes and matched his previous year's finish of 18th in points. He did however come close to a win at the 2003 Sharpie 500 at his hometown in Bristol Tennessee. Marlin controlled the race early and mid-way and appeared to have victory in his hands until he was wrecked by Kurt Busch with less than 150 laps to go. Kurt Busch went on to win the race but apologized in victory lane. Sterling Marlin however was not pleased with Busch in post-race ceremonies, stating "What a bone-headed move. I guess Spencer didn't punch him hard enough.", as a reference to Kurt Busch and Jimmy Spencer's altercation the previous week. Busch would later say in a post-race interview, and later in a 2020 podcast with Dale Earnhardt Jr. that he offered to buy Marlin a six-pack of Coors as a peace offering, but was turned down.
 
Despite three Top 5s in 2004, he fell to 21st in points. During the 2005 season, Ganassi announced Marlin would be replaced by David Stremme for the 2006 season in order to attract the younger male demographic. It was also said that Richard Childress Racing had offered Marlin a deal to drive the No. 07 Jack Daniels-sponsored Chevrolet, However, Marlin honored his contract with Ganassi and finished out the 2005 season. He did however miss one race-the 2005 Sirius at the Glen to attend the funeral of his father Coo Coo Marlin who died of lung cancer one day before the race. Road ringer Scott Pruett replaced Sterling in the 40 and finished fourth in the race.

He reached as high as 6th in the points standings, but would later fall to 30th in the final standings.

Marlin joined MB2 Motorsports for 2006 to drive the Waste Management Chevy, running with the No. 14 in tribute to his father, Coo Coo Marlin, who died during the 2005 season. Marlin's only Top 10 finish in 2006 was ninth place at Richmond.  His 2006 season was shadowed by bad luck and No. 14 finished 36th in owner points.

2007–2010
Marlin was able to qualify via speed for each of the first five races of the 2007 season, his Pep Boys No. 14 team was the only team out of the top 35 from 2006 to do this. Marlin's run in the No. 14 ended on July 17, 2007, when Ginn Racing announced Regan Smith, who had been splitting time with Mark Martin in Ginn's U.S. Army-sponsored No. 01 car, would replace him beginning at the Allstate 400 at the Brickyard at Indianapolis. He attempted to qualify for two races in 2007, but he failed to qualify for either. He tried to make the Sharpie 500 at Bristol in the No. 78 car as a replacement for Kenny Wallace, and the UAW-Ford 500 at Talladega, replacing Mike Wallace in the No. 09 car. However, in November he managed to qualify the No. 09 and drove at Phoenix for a 25th-place finish, and a week later at Homestead finishing 33rd.

Marlin failed to qualify for the 2008 Daytona 500 in the No. 09 car, but qualified at Talladega and the following week at Richmond as well. For Darlington, Marlin raced in his old No. 40 car and qualified 14th, and also at the Coca-Cola 600 at Lowe's Motor Speedway in the No. 40, still in for the injured Dario Franchitti. He finished out the rest of the season driving for Phoenix Racing. In March 2009, Marlin participated in and won the Saturday Night Special, a charity event at Bristol Motor Speedway which included NASCAR Legends. He led the entire event in a car painted similar to the one he drove with Morgan McClure Motorsports, and wearing an older-style Coors Light uniform from his days while driving for Chip Ganassi.

For the 2009 NASCAR Sprint Cup Series, Marlin continued to run a limited schedule in the No. 09 Phoenix Racing Miccosukee Resort & Gaming Chevrolet.  His best finish for the 2009 season was 35th at Martinsville, which also proved the last of his 748 career starts.

An announcement was made preceding the Cup Series finale weekend at Homestead-Miami Speedway that Marlin would attempt the race in the No. 70 Chevrolet for TRG Motorsports, though Marlin later denied it.

Retirement
Marlin announced his retirement from racing on March 18, 2010, and formerly owned a Chevrolet dealership in Ashland City, Tennessee and a Dodge dealership in Dickson, Tennessee. In 2012, Marlin publicly revealed that he had been diagnosed with Parkinsonism.  He has undergone deep brain stimulation surgical procedures at Vanderbilt University Medical Center as part of his treatment.

Presently
In late 2011, Marlin helped form Tennessee Racing Association, LLC, along with several other drivers (including Chad Chaffin and Mike Alexander) and businessmen, in an effort to preserve Fairgrounds Speedway and allow the track to remain active in the racing community.

Although he is retired from NASCAR competition, Marlin still remains a semi-active driver in the Pro Late Model Division at Fairgrounds Speedway.

Television appearances
In 2003, game show Family Feud hosted a NASCAR special with help from then-Family Feud host Richard Karn. Sterling Marlin was one of the drivers who appeared in an episode, along with some crew members from the Coors team. Marlin played against fellow driver Elliott Sadler and the #38 Robert Yates team, winning the game.

Motorsports career results

NASCAR
(key) (Bold – Pole position awarded by qualifying time. Italics – Pole position earned by points standings or practice time. * – Most laps led.)

Sprint Cup Series

Daytona 500

Nationwide Series

ARCA SuperCar Series
(key) (Bold – Pole position awarded by qualifying time. Italics – Pole position earned by points standings or practice time. * – Most laps led.)

International Race of Champions
(key) (Bold – Pole position. * – Most laps led.)

References

External links

Sterling Marlin at The Crittenden Automotive Library

 

Living people
1957 births
People from Columbia, Tennessee
Racing drivers from Tennessee
NASCAR drivers
International Race of Champions drivers
American Speed Association drivers
NASCAR team owners
People with Parkinson's disease
Chip Ganassi Racing drivers